Sphegina elegans is a species of hoverfly.

Description
External images
For terms see Morphology of Diptera
Wing length 5-6·75 mm. Humerus pale, yellow or orange. 3rd antennomere large. Mesonotum shining black, pollinose only on margins. Tarsi 1 and 2 pale. Wing hyaline. See references for determination.

Distribution
Palearctic Fennoscandia South to the Pyrenees and Spain. Ireland East through Central Europe and Southern Europe (northern Italy, the former Yugoslavia, northern Greece) into European Russia to the Caucasus mountains. Also Samos (Greece).

Biology
Habitat: Fagus and Quercus and other woodland, flying in partial shade and near streams.

References

Diptera of Europe
Eristalinae
Insects described in 1843
Taxa named by Theodor Emil Schummel